H-Gun Labs, officially, H-Gun Corp. (1988–2001), was a film/animation consortium that started in Chicago and expanded to include a San Francisco studio. H-Gun began as a collective of students from The School of The Art Institute of Chicago and Columbia College in Chicago who were involved with making art, film, and music. Originally, UNGH! was the name of the band formed by founders Eric Zimmermann and Benjamin Stokes. The band nearly got signed to major recording label, but the group disbanded. Once they began making visuals or music videos for the music they were producing, and for other recording artists, they created H-Gun Corp. The name was loosely referred to as "The Lab" or "H-Gun Labs".

The H-Gun family of friends, collaborators, fine artists, studio technicians, musicians consisted of core group of employees and many freelance and independent contractors. H-Gun gained attention by being a Chicago-based music video company when at the time the industry was dominated by East Coast and West Coast production companies.

Their early videos included work for their own band, Ungh! and led to commissions for the following recording artists:
Ministry, LaTour, Nine Inch Nails, Revolting Cocks, Public Enemy, De La Soul, Megadeth, Smashing Pumpkins, Killing Joke, Meat Beat Manifesto, Young Black Teenagers, Son of Bazerk, Anthrax, KMFDM, K Solo, Mr. Lee, Rights of the Accused, Del Tha Funkee Homosapien, I Mother Earth, Prong, Consolidated, 808 State, Crystal Waters, Soundgarden, Screaming Trees, Melvins, SNAFU, The Offspring, Infectious Grooves, Suicidal Tendencies, Fleming and John, Josh Wink, The Orb, Rise Robots Rise, Nude Swirl, Diamanda Galás, Lead Into Gold, Pigface, New Order, Fear of God, Brian May, Living Colour, Next School, Treponem Pal, Shaman, Poe, Skid Row, Mind Funk, Fred Schneider, Holly Palmer, Wax, Mint Condition, The Hangmen, Corrosion of Conformity, Teenage Fanclub, Supersuckers, Girls Vs Boys, Iron Maiden and many more.

The two original founding members were Eric Zimmermann and Ben Stokes. Quickly Eric Koziol a fellow School of the Art Institute of Chicago collaborator and freelance producer/assistant director, Jim Deloye joined the company and became shareholders. Other contributors to the H-Gun chemistry and artistry were Eric Matthies, Wing Ko, CW Hayes, Elizabeth Biron, Barbara Schwarz, Dawn Rubin, Adrian Dimond, Maximum Greyspace, David Marine, Craig Coutts, Roxanna Markewiecz, Mak Knighton, Dawn Smallman, Damon Mena, Laura Dame, Robert Bial, Jason Voke, Chris O'Dowd, Tau Gerber, James Colao, Vello Virkhaus, Robert Coddington, Davy Force, John Goodman, Ivan DeWolfe, Jon Schnepp, Patsy Desmond, Danielle Beverly, Ty Bardi, Sheleigh Highsmith (now a psychiatric nurse practitioner), and scores of interns, freelancers, friends and collaborators.

The artists at H-Gun approached filmmaking in a renegade style and in some cases defining "run and gun" style of filmmaking. The work was purely experimental and raw. In some cases footage that would normally be considered "outtakes" was included into the edits. H-Gun were early adopters in the use of Apple Macintosh computers and the earliest versions of animation software. As the company evolved, so did the visual styles that the collective pursued. H-Gun became one of the few (at the time) companies in the world that would shoot its own live action film, design its own motion graphics, 2D and 3D animation, and integrate the work into its own finished pieces. The progression of the work created by H-Gun garnered worldwide attention. The work has been curated by museums, chronicled by newspapers, and TV shows. Recently Soundgarden re-released the videos H-Gun produced and directed on its CD/DVD release "Telephantasm". H-Gun's work often won international awards with Promax / BDA, International Monitor Awards, Billboard Music Video Awards and the like.

As H-Gun evolved the company worked with directors Frank Kozik, David Yow, Paul Andresen, Nancy Bardowil and Spike Jonze on various videos either as director or co-directors.
H-Gun videos were often featured on marquee MTV shows such as 120 Minutes, Headbangers Ball and Beavis and Butt-Head. H-Gun evolved from music videos into doing major content like network ID's, commercials, and show opens.

In summer of 2000, the company decided that it would close its doors and that the owners would remain friends and explore other creative endeavors. The official closing date for the last delivery of commissioned work was January 2001.

Various former members of H-GUN currently play roles in animation, design, visual effects in Los Angeles, San Francisco, Chicago and New York City.

Founding member Ben Stokes is also a musician, recording artist and founding member of DHS (Dimensional Holofonic Sound) and Tino Corp. He also collaborates as a creative member of Meat Beat Manifesto. Stokes continues to do tour film work for DJ Shadow, and his own freelance VFX / Design artist clients.

Former founders, employees and freelancers are still involved in TV, film, music, animation, design production in the US.
Damon Mena is owner of Transistor Studios in New York City and Melbourne.
Former intern Jared Plummer is owner of Haus in Los Angeles.
Jon Schnepp has been contributing to the world of funny and cutting edge content creation in Los Angeles via his enterprise King Robot.

Clients
 MTV
 Cartoon Network
 Turner Classic Movies
 TNT
 Nickelodeon
 Pillsbury
 Locomotion
 M2
 Comedy Central
 MTV Latin America
 E! Entertainment Television
 Nickelodeon Russia
 Bravo
 NBC
 G4
 Lifetime
 A&E
 Discovery Channel
 Food Network
 YTV
 W

External links
 Website circa 1999

American animation studios